Elina is a genus of butterflies in the family Nymphalidae erected by Émile Blanchard in 1852. It is found in Chile.

Species
Elina montrolii (Feisthamel, 1839)
Elina vanessoides Blanchard, 1852

References

Satyrini
Butterfly genera
Taxa named by Émile Blanchard
Endemic fauna of Chile